These are the results of the men's C-1 slalom competition in canoeing at the 2004 Summer Olympics.  The C-1 (canoe single) event is raced by one-man canoes through a whitewater course.  The venue for the 2004 Olympic competition was the Olympic Canoe/Kayak Slalom Centre at the Helliniko Olympic Complex.

Medalists

Results
The 16 competitors each took two preliminary runs through the whitewater slalom course.  The top 12 canoeists by combined time from the two runs advanced to the semifinal.  The top 8 times from the single semifinal run determined the finalists.  Ranking and medals were based on the combined time of the semifinal run and the final run.  The preliminary runs were raced on August 17 and the semifinal and final runs were on August 18.

References
2004 Summer Olympics Canoe slalom results 
Sports-reference.com 2004 men's slalom C-1 results
Yahoo! Sports Athens 2004 Summer Olympics Canoe/Kayak Results

Men's Slalom C-1
Men's events at the 2004 Summer Olympics